CROP Inc. is a Canadian polling and market research firm based in Montreal, Quebec, Canada.  The company was founded in 1965 by Yvan Corbeil, who saw a disconnect between Toronto-based polling firms and the realities of Quebec society.

The company's political opinion polls are often cited in Quebec news media.

References

External links
 Company website

Public opinion research companies
Market research companies of Canada
Companies based in Montreal